Burg Heidenreichstein is a castle in Lower Austria, Austria.

The oldest parts of the castle are dated back to the 12th century. The castle has recently been inherited by the House of Kinsky.

See also
List of castles in Austria

References

This article was initially translated from the German Wikipedia.

Castles in Lower Austria